Karin Wahlberg (born 1950 in Kalmar, Sweden) is a Swedish obstetrician and author. She is most famous for her crime series about Criminal Inspector Claes Claesson and his wife Veronika Lundborg, chief physician at Oskarshamn Hospital. 
In 2012 her authorship was introduced to America. Her work has been likened to the traditional detective fiction of Agatha Christie.

Bibliography
 (2001) Sista Jouren
 (2002) Hon som tittade in 
 (2003) Ett fruset liv
 (2004) Flickan med majblommorna
 (2006) Blocket
 (2007) Tröstaren
 (2009) Sigrids hemlighet
 (2009) Matthandlare Olssons död 
 (2009) Camilla och lögnen
 (2010) Camilla och Micke
 (2011) Glasklart

In English
(2012) Death of a Carpet Dealer

External links
Karin Wahlberg in America
Karin Wahlberg's official website

References

1950 births
Living people
People from Kalmar
Swedish women writers
Swedish crime fiction writers
Writers from Småland